Alan Techer (born 8 September 1994 in Cannes) is an endurance world champion solo motorcycle racer from France, competing in the EWC championship with Tati Team Beringer Racing. Techer has competed in the French 125 cc Championship, the Spanish 125GP Championship, the FIM CEV Moto2 European Championship and the Red Bull MotoGP Rookies Cup.

He was part of the FIM Endurance World Championship-winning team in 2018, and in September 2022, as a substitute rider due to Gino Rea's injury, was part of the team which clinched the 2022 Endurance World Championship title at the last event of the season, the Bol d'Or race.
.

Career statistics

Red Bull MotoGP Rookies Cup

Races by year
(key) (Races in bold indicate pole position, races in italics indicate fastest lap)

FIM CEV Moto2 European Championship

Races by year
(key)

Grand Prix motorcycle racing

By season

Races by year
(key)

References

External links

1994 births
Living people
French motorcycle racers
Moto3 World Championship riders
Moto2 World Championship riders